Robert Müller (born 12 November 1986) is a German professional footballer who plays as a defender for Greifswalder FC.

References

External links

1986 births
Living people
German footballers
Sportspeople from Schwerin
Footballers from Mecklenburg-Western Pomerania
Germany under-21 international footballers
Germany youth international footballers
Association football defenders
Hertha BSC players
Hertha BSC II players
FC Carl Zeiss Jena players
Holstein Kiel players
FC Hansa Rostock players
SV Wehen Wiesbaden players
VfR Aalen players
KFC Uerdingen 05 players
FC Energie Cottbus players
SpVgg Unterhaching players
Bundesliga players
2. Bundesliga players
3. Liga players